The Abbott and Costello Cartoon Show is an American half-hour animated series of the famous comedy duo that aired in syndication from September 9, 1967, to June 1, 1968. Each of the 39 individual episodes consisted of four five-minute cartoons. The cartoons were created jointly by Hanna-Barbera, RKO General, and Jomar Productions between 1965 and 1967. The series was syndicated by Gold Key Entertainment and King World Productions, with the rights now owned by Warner Bros. Television Distribution.

The primary feature of this cartoon series was the fact that Bud Abbott supplied the voice for his own character. Stan Irwin provided the voice of Lou Costello, who had died in 1959. The rest of the voice cast was composed of Hanna-Barbera regulars. The Canadian cartoonist Lynn Johnston, who is famous for her comic strip, For Better or For Worse, was an uncredited cel colorist.

Production
Abbott and Costello was among the animated programs of the 1960s that were based on the decade's nostalgia craze which animated other comedy teams of the past such as Laurel and Hardy and The New 3 Stooges. The show created work for the ill and impoverished Bud Abbott, who provided the voice of his animated character. Lou Costello had died in 1959, and his voice was supplied by nightclub manager Stan Irwin (1920-2015), who was a close friend of the duo.

Voices
 Bud Abbott as Himself
 Stan Irwin as Lou Costello

Additional voices: Mel Blanc, Don Messick, Hal Smith, John Stephenson, Janet Waldo

Episodes

Comic book series
A comic book based on the TV show was produced by Charlton Comics.  Starting in February 1968, it ran for 22 issues, ending in August 1971.

Reception
Hal Erickson, author of Television Cartoon Shows, An Illustrated Encyclopedia gave the program a negative review, stating that  Abbott and Costello episodes were difficult to tell apart. Erickson stated that "virtually every one them features the tubby Costello being pursued by some bugeyed monster or giant sized garden pest" and that "None of the classic verbal exchanges which brought the real Abbott and Costello to fame in the first place are evident."

Home media
An episode of the show, "Gadzooka" was released in May 2013 as part of The Best of Warner Bros.: Hanna Barbera 25 Cartoon Collection DVD set.

See also
 The New Three Stooges
 Laurel and Hardy (animated series)
 Babbit and Catstello
 List of Hanna-Barbera characters
 List of works produced by Hanna-Barbera Productions

References
Notes

Sources

External links
 
 Abbott and Costello at Toonarific.com
 

1967 American television series debuts
1968 American television series endings
1960s American animated television series
American children's animated comedy television series
Television series by Hanna-Barbera
Television series by King World Productions
English-language television shows
First-run syndicated television programs in the United States
Animation based on real people
Cultural depictions of Abbott and Costello